Up and Down is a 2004 Czech comedy film directed by Jan Hřebejk. The film first premiered in France at the Cannes Film Market on May 19, 2004.

The film was the Czech Republic's submission to the 77th Academy Awards for the Academy Award for Best Foreign Language Film, but was not accepted as a nominee.

Plot
Milan and Goran are two criminals who smuggle illegal immigrants. One night after they complete a smuggle, they discover that one of the immigrants has left a baby behind. Milan and Goran decide to sell the baby to Lubos and Eman, who are responsible for running an illegal baby adoption center. Lubos and Eman make attempts to sell the baby to Miluska and Frantisek, a barren couple. Concurrently a university professor is diagnosed with an inoperable brain tumor, setting into action a complicated train of family reunions, partings, and conflicts.

Cast

Awards and nominations
Czech Lion
Won, "Best Actress" - Emília Vášáryová
Won, "Best Director" - Jan Hřebejk
Won, "Best Film" 
Won, "Best Film Poster" - Ales Najbrt
Won, "Best Screenplay" - Petr Jarchovský
Won, "Critics' Award" - Jan Hřebejk
Nominated, "Best Actor" - Jirí Machácek
Nominated, "Best Art Direction" - Milan Býcek & Katarina Bielikova
Nominated, "Best Cinematography" - Jan Malír
Nominated, "Best Music" - Ales Brezina
Nominated, "Best Sound" - Michal Holubec
Nominated, "Best Supporting Actor" - Petr Forman
Nominated, "Best Supporting Actor" - Jan Tříska
Nominated, "Best Supporting Actress" - Ingrid Timková

Pilsen Film Festival
Won, "Best Film"

References

External links

 

Up and Down at Eurochannel

2004 films
Films directed by Jan Hřebejk
2004 comedy films
Sony Pictures Classics films
Czech Lion Awards winners (films)
Czech comedy films
2000s Czech-language films